The Natchaug Trail is a Blue-Blazed hiking trail "system" which meanders through  of forests in northeast Connecticut—primarily in Windham County. It is maintained by the Connecticut Forest and Park Association. Its southern trailhead begins in the James L. Goodwin State Forest in the towns of  Chaplin, Connecticut and Hampton, Connecticut and the northern terminus is at its intersection with the Nipmuck Trail in Natchaug State Forest in Eastford, Connecticut.

For much of its length the Natchaug Trail travels through two Connecticut state forests—the James L. Goodwin State Forest and Natchaug State Forest as well as the much smaller Nathaniel Lyons Memorial Park.  Camping permits may be obtained by backpackers for both state forests.

In addition to the Nipmuck Trail there are several smaller hiking trails which connect to the Natchaug Trail as well as several park and forest roads and the multi-use Airline State Park Linear Trail.

In Natchaug State Forest the CCC Trail is a historic loop trail which was built by the Civilian Conservation Corps during the Great Depression in the 1930s.

Two of the several trails inside the James L. Goodwin State Forest are connected to the Natchaug Trail have recently been blazed as official CFPA trails.  According to signs at the James L. Goodwin State Forest the White Trail is being (or has been) re-blazed as a blue-white trail named the "Pine Acres Lake View Trail".  A CFPA blue-orange blazed trail also intersects with the Natchaug Trail during the stretch between Pine Acres Lake and Black Spruce Pond.

Description

The Natchaug Trail is primarily used for hiking, backpacking, picnicking, and in the winter, snowshoeing.

Portions of the trail are suitable for, and are used for, cross-country skiing and geocaching. Site-specific activities enjoyed along the route include bird watching, hunting (very limited), fishing, horseback riding,  bouldering and rock climbing (limited).

Route

The northern end of the Natchaug Trail connects with the Nipmuck Trail 1200 feet south of Eastford Road in Ashford, Connecticut in northern Natchaug State Forest.  After crossing the unpaved Moon Road, the northern third of the trail generally parallels Bigelow Brook until it merges with the Stones and Stills brooks to become the Natchaug River.  For most of the southern two thirds of the trail's length it follows both Connecticut Route 198 and the Natchaug River through the Natchaug and James L. Goodwin State Forests to the southern end at the James L. Goodwin Conservation Center at the southern end of Pine Acres Lake.

Trail communities

The official Blue-Blazed Natchaug Trail passes through land located within the following municipalities, from south to north:

Hampton, Connecticut,
Chaplin, Connecticut,
Ashford, Connecticut,
Eastford, Connecticut

History and folklore

The Blue-Blazed Natchaug Trail was created by the Connecticut Forest and Park Association.
As it did not appear in the 1969 version of the CFPA Connecticut Walk Book and it appears in the 1973 version it would appear to have been created during the 1969-1973 period.

Origin and name

Natchaug is a Nipmuc Native American word meaning "land between the rivers".

The name Natchaug is used as a geographical place name throughout Eastern Connecticut and particularly in Tolland and Windham counties in Northeastern Connecticut.  It was not the name of a native American tribe or group, but of a particular area in Connecticut.

Today the name Natchaug appears as the name of a trail, road, river, elementary school, hospital and state forest.

Historic sites

The Natchaug state forest occupies a portion of the former hunting grounds of the Wabbaquasset Indians between the Bigelow and Still Rivers.

The James L. Goodwin State Forest is named for, and occupies land donated by its namesake.
James L. Goodwin was one of the first Yale University School of Forestry graduates and began using modern forest management practices in the northeastern part of Connecticut.  He also created and donated the James L. Goodwin Conservation Center to the state to educate the people of Connecticut regarding "general, wildlife and forest conservation."

There are two memorials to Nathaniel Lyon, the first Union general to die in the US Civil War along the Natchaug Trail.

Nathaniel Lyon Memorial State Park contains the birthplace of General Lyon, although only the very large fireplace remains.

General Nathaniel Lyon Memorial in General Lyon Cemetery (established 1805) is located in the Phoenixville section of Eastford just north of the northern end of a portion of General Lyon Road overlaps with the Natchaug Trail.

Folklore

There are remains of foundations for stone houses, dams and cisterns along both the Natchaug Trail and CCC side trail.

There are several letterboxes cached along both trails including two official State of Connecticut Department of Environmental Protection (DEP) letterboxes.  One is in Natchaug State Forest on the CCC Trail  and the other is in the James L. Goodwin State Forest near Pine Acres Lake  close by a three-sided cellar hole where the local legend says that the smell of wood smoke can often still be detected on cold January nights from a long gone chimney.

There is a trail register notebook in a can affixed to the northern end of a foot bridge over Stones Brook on the Natchaug Trail approximately 0.6 mile south of Connecticut Route 44.

Hiking

The mainline trail is blazed with blue rectangles. Trail descriptions are available from a number of commercial and non-commercial sources, and a complete guidebook is published by the Connecticut Forest and Park Association

It is regularly maintained, and is considered easy hiking, with very few sections of rugged and moderately difficult hiking.

Much of the trail is close to public roads.  There are camping facilities along the trail in the two state forests.  Otherwise camping is generally prohibited in the other areas along the trail.  There are nearby commercial camping accommodations available on Connecticut Route 198, in particular the Charlie Brown Campground  in Eastford and the Nickerson Park Family Campground in Chaplin (visible on the western bank of the Natchaug River from the CCC side trail).

Weather along the route is typical of Connecticut. Conditions on exposed ridge tops and summits may be harsher during cold or stormy weather. Lightning is a hazard on exposed summits and ledges during thunderstorms. Snow is common in the winter and may necessitate the use of snowshoes. Ice can form on exposed ledges and summits, making hiking dangerous without special equipment.

Biting insects can be bothersome during warm weather. Parasitic deer ticks (which are known to carry Lyme disease) are a potential hazard.

Almost all of the trail is adjacent to, or is on lands where hunting and the use of firearms are permitted.
Wearing bright orange clothing during the hunting season (Fall through December) is recommended.

Image gallery

See also
 Blue-Blazed Trails
 Connecticut Route 198
 Nipmuck Trail
 Natchaug River
 Natchaug State Forest
 James L. Goodwin State Forest
 List of place names in New England of aboriginal origin

References

 Connecticut Forest & Park Association Cited September 13, 2008.

Further reading
Books – Connecticut Hiking
 
 
 
 
 
 
Books – Connecticut History and Geography

External links

Government links:
  Town of Mansfield - Trail Guides
 Town of Mansfield - Schoolhouse Brook Park
 State of Connecticut James L. Goodwin State Forest web page
 State of Connecticut James L. Goodwin State Forest Color Map
 State of Connecticut James L. Goodwin State Forest Black and White Map
 State of Connecticut Natchaug State Forest web page

Land and Conservation trusts:
 Joshua's Tract Conservation and Historic Trust, Inc.
 Joshua's Tract/Tract Trails Walk Book

 

Hiking trails in Connecticut
Protected areas of Windham County, Connecticut
Ashford, Connecticut
Chaplin, Connecticut
Eastford, Connecticut
Hampton, Connecticut